Rachel Joyce (born 16 June 1978) is an English professional triathlete. She is the winner of the 2011 ITU Long Distance Triathlon World Championships and the second-place finisher at the 2013 Ironman World Championship and 2015 Ironman World Championship. She races in primarily long-distance triathlon events, such as Ironman and Ironman 70.3 distances, and has won events such as Ironman Mont Tremblant in 2017 and Challenge Roth in 2012.

Career
Joyce was born in Mexico City and raised in Woodbridge, Suffolk. She participated in a variety of activities growing up including gymnastics and ice skating. In high school, she swam for the Ipswich Swimming Club and competed on a national level, but eventually burned out at age 17. She read politics and law at the University of Birmingham, where she joined the swim team, which had a more social approach to the sport. At university she also competed in her first triathlon. 
Joyce went on to the College of Law at Guildford and after graduating she went to work for the law firm Taylor Wessing in London as a construction solicitor.

In 2005, while working in London, Joyce continued to train with a masters swimming club. She trained and raced the London Marathon, where she ran a 3:03, and became further interested in endurance sports. Joyce purchased a bike and did some cycle touring in New Zealand. In 2006, she raced more Ironman 70.3 distance races, competing as an amateur in the 25-29 age group. That year she was the overall age group winner at the Ironman Monaco 70.3 race and the 5th place woman overall. She went on to compete at the 2006 Ironman 70.3 World Championship where she won her age group, and had the 12th fastest woman's overall time. The next year she reduced her work hours with her law firm to devote more time to training and to try to make it as a professional triathlete. But 2007 left her sidelined with injuries and illness and she considered abandoning her pursuit of becoming a pro. However, Joyce continued on with professional triathlon in 2008 and resigned from her law firm.

Professional triathlete
In 2008, Joyce took 5th at Ironman Florida and 6th at Ironman 70.3 UK. The following year she took 2nd and 3rd at Ironman Lanzarote and Ironman South Africa. With the goal of finishing in the top 10, Joyce took 6th place at the 2009 Ironman World Championship. In 2010, she improved her placing with a 5th place at the 2010 Ironman World Championship. She continued to show improved results in 2011, notching a win at Ironman Lanzarote and taking second at Ironman South Africa and Ironman 70.3 Ireland. At the Ironman World Championships that year she missed a podium spot by taking 4th at the race, just behind Leanda Cave. A month later Joyce won the 2011 ITU Long Distance Triathlon World Championships over second place Cave.

There was further success in 2012 as Joyce won Ironman 70.3 Kansas, Ironman 70.3 Muskoka, and Challenge Roth to also claim the European Long Distance Triathlon Championship. She also took second against a strong field of competition at Ironman Melbourne and 5th at the Abu Dhabi International Triathlon. At the 2013 Ironman Texas race, Joyce grabbed her third Ironman win by leading from start to finish and beating the second-place finisher by 36 minutes. That same year, coming into the 2013 Ironman World Championships, Joyce was considered to be among the favorites to win the event. In the race she was leading during the run, but was overtaken midway through the marathon by Mirinda Carfrae. Joyce would hold on to her position to finish second, her highest finish at the championship event. Her finishing time was the 5th fastest women's time in the Championship's history and the fourth woman to have broken 9 hours at the event.

Results
Joyce's notable achievements include:

References

External links

1978 births
Living people
English female triathletes
Alumni of the University of Birmingham
Alumni of The University of Law
People from Woodbridge, Suffolk
Sportspeople from Suffolk